The 2006 IAAF World Cross Country Championships took place on April 1/2, 2006.  The races were held at the Umi-no-nakamichi Seaside Park in Fukuoka, Japan, Japan's National Cross Country Course which is the permanent residence of the annual Fukuoka International Cross Country meeting.

The event was once again dominated by Ethiopian and Kenyan runners and also Eritrean runners. Kenenisa Bekele won both men's individual races, proving himself the most successful Cross country runner.  Reports of the event were given in The New York Times, and for the IAAF.

Complete results for senior men, for senior men's teams, for men's short race, for men's short race teams, for junior men, for junior men's teams, senior women, for senior women's teams, for women's short race, for women's short race teams, for junior women,  for junior women's teams, medallists, and the results of British athletes who took part were published.

Medallists

Race results

Senior men's race (12 km)

Kenenisa Bekele took his fifth consecutive long race title. At the team competition Eritrea surprisingly beat Ethiopia and lost to Kenya only by four points.

Note: Athletes in parentheses did not score for the team result.

Men's short race (4 km)

Kenenisa Bekele took his fifth consecutive short race title. The 1999 winner, Benjamin Limo of Kenya finished fourth.

Note: Athletes in parentheses did not score for the team result.

Junior men's race (8 km)

Note: Athletes in parentheses did not score for the team result.

Senior women's race (8 km)

Tirunesh Dibaba took her second consecutive long race title.

Note: Athletes in parentheses did not score for the team result.

Women's short race (4 km)

Ethiopia won the team competition beating Kenya only by a single point.

Note: Athletes in parentheses did not score for the team result.

Junior women's race (6 km)

Note: Athletes in parentheses did not score for the team result.

Medal table (unofficial)

Note: Totals include both individual and team medals, with medals in the team competition counting as one medal.

Participation
According to an unofficial count, 574 athletes from 59 countries participated.  This is in agreement with the official numbers as published.  The announced athlete from  did not show.

 (18)
 (4)
 (4)
 (21)
 (1)
 (9)
 (4)
 (1)
 (4)
 (9)
 (5)
 (28)
 (4)
 (12)
 (1)
 (2)
 (3)
 (4)
 (19)
 (27)
 (12)
 (1)
 (3)
 (3)
 (3)
 (1)
 (4)
 (15)
 (10)
 (36)
 (4)
 (36)
 (2)
 (8)
 (28)
 (1)
 (9)
 (5)
 (4)
 (17)
 (2)
 (14)
 (2)
 (10)
 (12)
 (1)
 (18)
 (8)
 (22)
 (2)
 (3)
 (3)
 (4)
 (1)
 (13)
 (31)
 (34)
 (8)
 (4)

See also
 2006 IAAF World Cross Country Championships – Senior men's race
 2006 IAAF World Cross Country Championships – Men's short race
 2006 IAAF World Cross Country Championships – Junior men's race
 2006 IAAF World Cross Country Championships – Senior women's race
 2006 IAAF World Cross Country Championships – Women's short race
 2006 IAAF World Cross Country Championships – Junior women's race
 2006 in athletics (track and field)

References

External links
Official site

 
2006
Cross Country Championships
IAAF World Cross Country Championships
International athletics competitions hosted by Japan
Cross country running in Japan
Sports competitions in Fukuoka